Nyctemera muelleri is a moth of the family Erebidae first described by Vollenhoven in 1863. It is found on Sumatra, Peninsular Malaysia and Borneo, as well as in southern Myanmar, Thailand, Vietnam and the Philippines (Palawan, Tawitawi).

Subspecies
Nyctemera muelleri muelleri (southern Burma, Thailand, Vietnam, Malaysia, Sumatra, Borneo, Palawan, Tawitawi)
Nyctemera muelleri eddela (Swinhoe, 1904) (Engano)
Nyctemera muelleri mentawaiensis de Vos, 2002 (Mentawai, Sipora, Siberut)

References

Nyctemerina
Moths described in 1863